The Bank of Italy building is an historic 8-story,  mid-rise in downtown Fresno, California. The building was completed in 1918 for the Bank of Italy, that later became the Bank of America. Its chief designer was Charles H. Franklin of the R.F. Felchlin Company. The completely vacant building is the ninth tallest in the city, and is listed on the U.S. National Register of Historic Places. The building was sold to the Penstar Group, a Fresno-based developer, in 2009.

References

External links
Bank of Italy (1917) at the Historic Fresno website

Bank buildings on the National Register of Historic Places in California
Commercial buildings completed in 1918
National Register of Historic Places in Fresno County, California
Renaissance Revival architecture in California
Skyscraper office buildings in California
Skyscrapers in Fresno, California